Mystery Street is a 1950 American black-and-white film noir featuring Ricardo Montalbán, Sally Forrest, Bruce Bennett, Elsa Lanchester, and Marshall Thompson.  Produced by MGM, it was directed by John Sturges with cinematography by John Alton.

The film was shot on location in Boston and Cape Cod; according to one critic, it was "the first commercial feature to be predominantly shot" on location in Boston. Also featured are Harvard Medical School in Boston, Massachusetts and Harvard Yard in nearby Cambridge. According to Frances Glessner Lee biographer Bruce Goldfarb, the story of the death of Irene Perry, in Dartmouth, Massachusetts, in 1940, as suggested by Glessner Lee (creator of The Nutshell Studies of Unexplained Death), was the basis of the film. The story earned Leonard Spigelgass a nomination as Best Story for the 1951 Academy Awards.

Plot
Brassy blonde B-girl Vivian (Jan Sterling) is agitated and seeking to arrange a meeting with a man she has been dating. In spite of confiding to him she's "in trouble", he refuses to meet her at the bar where she works, "The Grass Skirt," in Boston, and stops taking her calls. She then picks up a very drunk Henry Shanway (Marshall Thompson), so she can use his car to drive to Cape Cod to confront the man face to face.

Vivian drives. When Shanway realizes he's out on the Cape some 60 miles from Boston he demands to be taken back. Instead, she ditches him and steals his car. When Vivian rendezvous with her reluctant beau, he shoots and kills her. He hurriedly buries her body in the dunes and sinks the car in a pond.

Shanway subsequently reports his stolen car to his insurance, but claims it had been right outside the hospital where his pregnant wife, Grace (Sally Forrest), was recovering from a miscarriage. Months later a partially exposed skeleton is found on the beach.  Massachusetts State Police Detective Lieutenant Peter Moralas (Montalbán), a determined and ethnically proud policeman assigned to the District Attorney of Barnstable County  is assigned to team up with another department detective to investigate the case.  The pair seeks the help of Dr. McAdoo (Bruce Bennett), a forensics specialist at Harvard Medical School, to learn what the skeleton can reveal.

McAdoo determines it is of a young woman, who was pregnant at the time of her death, sensational angles which the press plays up. Mrs. Smerrling (Elsa Lanchester), the  conniving owner of the boarding house where Vivian lived, tracks down and tries to blackmail a wealthy married man Vivian called from her boarding house, James Harkley (Edmon Ryan). Snooping in the man's desk when he is called out of his office, Smerrling goes so far as to steal his gun during her visit. Soon after, Moralas, working at that point in Boston with a partner assigned to him by the Boston Police Department, tracks down the stolen car from police records and questions Henry Shanway. Local authorities on the Cape eventually finds Shanway's car in the pond, and he's identified in a police lineup by a variety of figures he encountered during his drunken foray and afterwards, when trying to locate Vivian at her boarding house. Mrs. Smerrling, who was present at the lineup, never mentions the gun, Mr. Harkley, or, obviously, her blackmail attempt.  As a result the innocent Shanway is arrested and charged with murder.  Grace can only wonder what her husband had gotten himself involved in, evidently killing his pregnant lover while she was hospitalized after losing their baby.

Still trying to wring more out of his evidence, Dr. McAdoo discovers with Moralas' help a bullet stuck in the car that had shattered one of the skeleton's ribs. As the case develops, Moralas begins to reconsider his conviction of Shanway's guilt. Later, Smerrling shows Harkley's gun to Jackie Elcott (Betsy Blair), a tenant in her building, who is familiar with firearms.  Elcott subsequently reads in the paper the killer used a .45 caliber automatic and informs Lt. Moralas that Smerrling has the same type of gun. Smerrling cleverly hides the .45 in a carpet bag and checks it at a nearby train station.

Before Moralas can question her she again attempts to blackmail Mr. Harkley, this time for $20,000, setting up a rendezvous at her home. He arrives and threatens to kill her unless she gives him back his gun. Terrified, she discloses where the gun is, but not its claim check.  He strikes her over the head with a candlestick and she's killed.  Moralas shows up, but loses Harkley in a car chase. The next morning, Moralas gets a phone call telling him Shanway has escaped.  While at Smerrling's home He comes across the baggage claim check hidden in her birdcage, which sends Moralas racing to catch the killer at Trinity Station before he can get to the bag first. Still, Harkley succeeds.  Arriving at the train station, Moralas chases down Harkley, apprehends him, and takes him into custody. Morales tells the police to stop looking for Shanway. He calls Shanway's wife over the phone, telling her that her husband is freed of all charges. Mrs. Shanway can only respond with glassy-eyed silence.

Cast
 Ricardo Montalbán as Lieutenant Peter Moralas 
 Sally Forrest as Grace Shanway 
 Bruce Bennett as Dr. McAdoo, of Harvard Medical School 
 Elsa Lanchester as Mrs. Smerrling, the landlady 
 Marshall Thompson as Henry Shanway, Grace's husband
 Jan Sterling as Vivian Heldon, bar-girl and murder victim
 Edmon Ryan as James Joshua Harkley
 Betsy Blair as Jackie Elcott
 Wally Maher as Tim Sharkey
 Ralph Dumke as A Tattooist
 Willard Waterman as A Mortician
 Walter Burke as An Ornithologist
 Don Shelton as A District Attorney

Reception
According to MGM records the film earned $429,000 domestically and $346,000 foreign, resulting in a loss of $284,000.

Critical response
Time magazine called it a "low-budget melodrama without box-office stars or advance ballyhoo [that] does not pretend to do much more than tell a straightaway, logical story of scientific crime detection" but notes that "within such modest limits, Director John Sturges and Scripters Sydney Boehm and Richard Brooks have treated the picture with such taste and craftsmanship that it is just about perfect."  The New York Times called it  "an adventure which, despite a low budget, is not low in taste or its attention to technical detail, backgrounds and plausibility" with a performance by Montalban that is "natural and unassuming."

Honors
Nominated
 Academy Awards: Best Writing, Motion Picture Story, Leonard Spigelgass; 1951.

References

External links
 
 
 
 
 

1950 films
1950 crime drama films
American black-and-white films
American crime drama films
Film noir
Films directed by John Sturges
Films set in Boston
Films set in Massachusetts
Films shot in Massachusetts
Metro-Goldwyn-Mayer films
1950s English-language films
1950s American films